John V, Count of Hoya ( – 10 April 1466), nicknamed the Pugnacious, or the Wild, was the ruling Count of Hoya from 1426 until his death.  He was the son of Count Eric I of Hoya and his wife Helen, the daughter of Duke Magnus II Torquatus.  His brother Albert was Bishop of Minden.  His brothers Eric and Otto were administrators of Münster and Bremen respectively.

Reign 

John spent his life fighting wars and feuds.  Shortly after he took up government, he fought in the Battle of Detern.  Later, he fought wars against the cities of Lüneburg, Bremen and Osnabrück.  In 1441, he was taken prisoner by the citizens of Osnabrück.  He spent the next six years in the so-called , a small oak dungeon cell in the Bucksturm tower.  After he was released, he fought in the Feud of Soest and the Feud of Münster.

During his reign, the St. Martin's church in Nienburg was built.  It was consecrated in 1441.  John V died in 1466 and was buried in this church.

Marriage and issue 
In 1459, when he was already over sixty years old, he married Elisabeth of Diepholz.  They had three sons:
 Jobst I, his successor
 Eric, died young
 Albert, also died young

References 
 Heinrich Gade: Historisch-geographisch-statistische Beschreibung der Grafschaften Hoya und Diepholz, Nienburg, 1901
 Wilhelm Hodenberg (ed.): Hoyer Urkundenbuch, Hannover, 1848–1856
 Bernd Ulrich Hucker: Die Grafen von Hoya, Hoya, 1993
 Museum Nienburg: Die Grafschaften Bruchhausen, Diepholz, Hoya und Wölpe, Nienburg, 2000

Counts of Hoya
14th-century births
Year of birth uncertain
1466 deaths
15th-century German people
Burials at St. Martin Church, Nienburg